Moshe Mordechai Epstein (7 March 1866–28 November 1933) was rosh yeshiva of Yeshiva Knesseth Yisrael in Slabodka, Lithuania and is recognized as having been one of the leading Talmudists of the twentieth century. He is also one of the founders of the city of Hadera.

Childhood
Epstein was born in Bakst, in the Vilna district of Lithuania, on the 20th of Adar, 5626 (1866), to Rabbi Tzvi Chaim and Baila Chana Epstein. His father, who served as the rabbi of Bakst, had been affectionately referred to during his days in the Volozhin yeshiva as "the Bakst Genius". Moshe Mordechai's genius was detected from a very early age and he was called the illui from Bakst. The child prodigy began studying in the Volozhin yeshiva at the age of 16, under the guidance of the legendary Torah giant Rabbi Chaim Soloveitchik. There, he met his brother-in-law-to-be, Rabbi Isser Zalman Meltzer, and, in 1889, married Menucha Frank, the eldest "Frank sister".

Leadership
After his marriage, Epstein moved to his wife's hometown, in Kovno, and was joined there two years later by Rabbi Meltzer, following his marriage to Epstein's sister-in-law, Baila Hinda Frank. In Kovno, the two scholars studied under the renowned mussar master, Rabbi Yitzchak Blazer, known in yeshivos as "Reb Itzele Peterburger", one of Rabbi Yisrael Salanter's foremost disciples. It was there that they became intrigued with the study of mussar.

In 1894, both rabbis started teaching in the famed Slabodka yeshiva, which was not far from Kovno. In 1897, Nosson Tzvi Finkel, Slabodka's famed mashgiach ruchani), invited Epstein to become the rosh yeshiva. Epstein accepted the post, while Meltzer moved together with some of his best talmidim to the town of Slutsk to lead the Ridvaz's yeshiva there. The Slabodka yeshiva flourished under the joint leadership of Rabbis Epstein and Finkel, and many of its students were crucial in nurturing the spiritual level of the Jewish people in subsequent generations. For a list of notables, see Slabodka yeshiva.

In 1924, Rabbi Epstein was part of a delegation to the United States headed by Rabbi Abraham Isaac Kook, chief rabbi of the Land of Israel.

In 1924, Epstein, Finkel, and most of the yeshiva, relocated to Hebron, in what was then British Mandate for Palestine. The yeshiva thrived for five years in Hebron as it had in Lithuania. In late August 1929 mobs, incited by the antisemitic Mufti of Jerusalem, swarmed the yeshiva, killing over 67 Jews and wounding many more, in an event known as the 1929 Hebron massacre. Among the victims was his American-born nephew Aaron David Epstein. In the aftermath, the British authorities evacuated the rest of the Jewish community. The yeshiva was relocated to the Geula section of Jerusalem, and was renamed Yeshivas Chevron. In 1975, Yeshivas Chevron moved to its current location in Givat Mordechai.

Legacy
Epstein was known to share a warm relationship with Finkel. Epstein's daughter married Finkel's son, Moshe Finkel. Epstein's other daughter married Yechezkel Sarna (1895–1969), who succeeded Epstein as rosh yeshiva of Chevron after his death. Epstein had only one son, Chaim Shraga Feivel, whom he named after his father-in-law. Epstein authored the Levush Mordechai (1901), which contains his chiddushim, or novellae, on all tractates of the Talmud.

His brother, Rabbi Ephraim Epstein (1876-1960) also studied at the Slabodka yeshiva, and later moved to the United States were he served as rabbi to Congregation Anshei Kneseth in Chicago for over 50 years. Rabbi Ephraim Epstein's son, Rabbi Harry Epstein, headed  Ahavath Achim Congregation in Atlanta Georgia for over 50 years and founded what is now called the Epstein School.

Epstein died in Jerusalem in 1933, corresponding to the Hebrew date 10 of Kislev 5694. He is buried on the Mount of Olives.

External links and references

Lithuanian Haredi rabbis
Haredi rabbis in Europe
Haredi rabbis in Mandatory Palestine
Rosh yeshivas
Rabbis from Kaunas
1866 births
1933 deaths
Burials at the Jewish cemetery on the Mount of Olives
Academic staff of Slabodka yeshiva